The 1899–1900 WPHL season was the third season of operation for the Western Pennsylvania Hockey League. Four Pittsburgh-area teams competed in the season, in which all games were played at the Duquesne Gardens. While the Pittsburgh Bankers were added to the league and began play, the season marked the final year that an amateur team representing Western University, played in the league. The Pittsburgh Athletic Club repeated as the league champions, for their second league title.

Final standings

References
 

Western Pennsylvania Hockey League seasons
WPHL